Jericho (Joseph William Wilson) is a fictional character who appears in comic books published by DC Comics. The character was originally a superhero, the son of Deathstroke, and a member of the Teen Titans during The New Teen Titans period by Marv Wolfman and George Pérez. Since the early 1990s, Jericho has gone through periods of both sanity and insanity.

Joe Wilson going by the name "Kane Wolfman" appeared as a recurring character on the sixth and seventh seasons of The CW Arrowverse show Arrow, played by Liam Hall. This version never became a metahuman and a mute. Jericho also appeared as a recurring character on the second season of the DC Universe series Titans portrayed by Chella Man.

Publication history
Jericho first appeared in Tales of the Teen Titans #43 and was created by Marv Wolfman and George Pérez.

Development
Jericho was created in the early 1980s, a few years after Marv Wolfman and George Pérez relaunched the Teen Titans series and turned it into a major hit for DC Comics. At the time, Wolfman and Pérez were interested in distancing the team from the Justice League, many of whose members had been mentors to the Titans. This meant introducing new characters such as the mystical Raven and the technological Cyborg, as well as changing some of the existing characters, such as having Dick Grayson trade in his identity as Robin in favor of becoming Nightwing. Jericho was part of this process of establishing the team as its own feature rather than, in Pérez' words, a "Justice Little League". Marv Wolfman had decided on the name, which he got from an unused story from the previous Titans series, and with the idea of Jericho being the son of Deathstroke, but could not think of any other aspects of the character. George Pérez worked out the design, powers, and personality of Jericho and also suggested making the character mute. In something of a departure, he also insisted that Jericho's emotions be conveyed entirely through visuals, without the use of thought balloons. Pérez claims that Jericho is the first character which he created solely by himself.

Fictional character biography

Childhood
Jericho was the youngest son of Slade Wilson (Deathstroke the Terminator) and Adeline Kane Wilson, and had a happy early childhood. Jericho was a musical prodigy as well being a talented artist. When he was a child, he was held hostage by the terrorist called the Jackal, sent by the Qurac president in retaliation for Deathstroke killing an important colonel. Jackal attempted to obtain information from Slade Wilson, who was secretly leading a double life as a mercenary. After Deathstroke refused to cooperate with Jackal, citing a violation of his professional code of ethics, Wilson managed to rescue his son, but not before one of Jackal's men cut Joseph's throat. As a result, Jericho was rendered mute.

Following the incident, Jericho's mother Adeline divorced Slade (she had previously tried to kill him, but only succeeded in blinding him in one eye) and took Jericho and his older brother Grant with her. At some point, Jericho learned to communicate through sign language (identified in Action Comics #584 as American Sign Language). While still a child, Jericho discovered that he possessed the mutant metahuman power to take possession of any humanoid being by making eye contact with them, a result of biological experimentation done on his father years before. He first manifested his powers when he was saving a friend in danger, but Jericho was left traumatized by the event and his powers would lie dormant until his late teens. By then, Jericho worked with his mother in her espionage organization, Searchers Inc., and received training in combat and stealth. During a mission, Jericho's powers fully awakened again to save his mother from an assassin, and he embraced his abilities to further aid his mother in her work.

Titans
Sometime later (in a storyline called "The Judas Contract"), Adeline and Joseph discovered that Deathstroke had accepted a contract on the Teen Titans. Adeline and Joseph approached Dick Grayson to help him rescue the Titans, with Joseph adopting the identity of Jericho. The rescue mission was a success, and Jericho subsequently joined the team, but the Titans were initially wary of him because of his relationship to Deathstroke and the betrayal of Terra.
 

Jericho proved to be a sensitive and pure-hearted individual and was a loyal Titan for many years. Shortly after he joined the Titans, another new member, Kole, joined and Jericho immediately developed a bond with her. Jericho also developed a close and affectionate relationship with Raven, having possessed her once and learned about her demonic heritage. Jericho was the first Titan to understand Raven, bonding over their pasts with their fathers and finding comfort with one another.

Corruption
Unbeknownest to anyone, Jericho was possessed by the souls of Azarath, tainted by the essence of the demon Trigon, Raven's father. Unable to possess Raven herself, the souls entered Jericho, as his powers made it easier for the souls to enter him. They were weak at first, but gained strength over time and eventually merged with him after some time following Trigon's defeat.

Jericho laid dormant within his own mind while the souls of Azarath began searching for new bodies. The souls needed individual vessels to survive and sought to acquire superhuman ones. Slowly but surely, the souls began corrupting Jericho and seized control of his body after the villain known as Wildebeest waged a campaign of terror against the Titans, framing Starfire for murder and nearly killing Cyborg after brainwashing him into serving as a proxy for him in a series of robberies. The possessed Jericho discovered that the Wildebeest was actually multiple people; members of the former Titans villain group The H.I.V.E., rebranded following the organization's defeat at the hands of the Titans years earlier as this group called themselves the Wildebeest Society. Imprisoning the lead Wildebeest, Jericho became the Wildebeest Society's new leader and used them to abduct current and former Titans to act as vessels. Jericho gained new powers: a powerful lion soul-self and a healing ability that repaired his throat and allowed him to speak again.

In the "Titans Hunt" storyline, Nightwing and Troia, accompanied by some new allies, found and confronted him. During the battle, the real Jericho resurfaced and begged his father to kill him. There was no help for him and, to spare his son any more suffering, Deathstroke killed him. A statue of Jericho was later erected in the Titans Tower memorial in San Francisco.

Return
Several years later, it was revealed that Jericho's spirit had survived by jumping inside his father right before he was killed. He had lain dormant until hearing that his friend Donna Troy had been killed in battle. Taking control of his father's body, he sought out the latest group of Titans, hoping to convince them that children shouldn't be superheroes and wanting to spare them his fate. He also killed his father's closest friend, Wintergreen, and mounted the man's head on a wall.

Further demonstrating his mental instability while in Deathstroke's body, he viciously attacked his former friends, and even shot Impulse in the knee.
 
During the combat, he jumped from body to body until Raven absorbed him. During a battle with Brother Blood, she repelled him when she unintentionally absorbed her teammates Deathstroke and Rose Wilson into her soul-self. Jericho managed to use the bodies of Wonder Girl and Superboy against the team, but when he tried to enter Cyborg, Cyborg used his cybernetic eye to transfer Jericho's spirit to a computer file, now stored in Titans Tower. Beast Boy says that they check on Jericho every day.

After the "One Year Later" jump following the events of Infinite Crisis, Raven took the disk with Jericho's essence and, using the same ritual the Church of Brother Blood previously employed to raise her from the dead, resurrected Jericho in a new body, missing the throat injuries from his childhood that left him mute. Jericho joined the latest incarnation of the team, taking the opportunity to bond with his half-sister Rose, who was the new Ravager. After possessing the body of Superboy's dangerous clone Match, Jericho moved to S.T.A.R. Labs until a way was found to control Match.

Later Jericho, still trapped in Match's body, seemingly escaped from S.T.A.R. Labs in visible distress and asking for his friends' help. The Titans managed to help him escape Match's body, but it soon became apparent how much the experience had twisted Jericho's mind, leaving him bent on the Titans' destruction.

Jericho briefly escaped the Titans to plague the presidential election of 2008 of the main DC Universe, even going so far as to use Green Lantern's body to fight the Justice League upon being discovered. The will-based powers of Hal proved to be his undoing, as Hal was able to push Jericho out of his body. Jericho was brought to the JLA satellite for safe-keeping. Mento mind probed Jericho, discovering that he had a particular and severe form of dissociative identity disorder, caused by years of reckless body-hopping. Unable to purge his mind of the lingering echoes of the personality he had to submerge when taking possession of an individual, he had his mind overruled by the evilest and most strong-willed patterns, causing him to take on a criminal, ruthless personality opposed to his former gentle self. The JLA decided to send him back to S.T.A.R. Labs, hoping for a cure.

Jericho managed to escape the JLA and returned to the Titans, now inhabiting Nightwing's body. The JLA arrived to reclaim him, and he started jumping into the bodies of whoever tried to capture him. This backfired when Jericho jumped into Superman's body. Although stronger than he once was, Jericho found himself unable to control Superman's alien body. Jericho briefly managed to gain control of himself over the evil impulses and seemingly vanished into nothingness.

Deathtrap
Jericho later returned, having entered Cyborg's body through his mechanical eye, using an "imprint" left over from the last time. He used Titans Tower's defenses to try to kill the Teen Titans, but their new member Static used his electrical powers to short out the Tower's systems, creating feedback that knocked Jericho out of Cyborg. Jericho escaped once more and, spurred on by the multiple personalities inside him (particularly that of his father), sets into motion a "Deathtrap" scenario. Jericho unsuccessfully attempted to murder both the Teen Titans and the Titans (his former teammates), who eventually apprehended him. While in police custody, he was confronted by the new Vigilante. Determined to end the villain's rampage permanently (but having promised Rose Wilson that he would not kill him), Vigilante gouged out both of his eyes, rendering him unable to use his possession abilities. The trauma of the incident caused Jericho to revert to his true personality, but he was left haunted by the various personalities in his mind.

Blackest Night
In a Teen Titans tie-in to the Blackest Night crossover, Jericho is seen in possession of Grant's body, now a member of the undead Black Lantern Corps, saving Rose from the attack of Adeline, Wintergreen, and Wade Defarge. Jericho revealed to Rose that his eyes grew back after Vigilante's attack, and that he used his power to enter Grant's body when Grant attempted to kill him. Jericho then entered his mother's body, tricking the Black Lanterns into destroying each other. In the aftermath, Jericho reconciled with his father, reasoning that Deathstroke would be the only one who could kill him if he were ever to succumb to the murderous personalities inside his mind.

Brightest Day
Deathstroke hired Doctor Sivana and Doctor Impossible to create a diabolical invention with a healing factor called the "Methuselah Device" to save Jericho, who was dying from leprosy. Once Jericho was placed in the machine, they restored Jericho's body. Deathstroke offers its abilities to all of the Titans, promising to restore their deceased loved ones as payment for their services. Some Titans accept, but other Titans refuse and the team fights. Deathstroke walks away with his son, but Jericho possesses him, disgusted at what his father did to achieve his restoration. He intends to destroy first the Methuselah Device, then himself and Deathstroke. While the Titans fight over the machine, its power source, a metahuman named DJ Molecule, is released. DJ Molecule blasts Deathstroke, knocking Jericho out of his body and is then slashed by Cheshire. When Cinder sacrifices herself to destroy the machine, Jericho is carried out by Arsenal. Arsenal and Jericho then decide to form a new team of Titans to restore the legacy that Deathstroke damaged.

The New 52
In The New 52 (a 2011 reboot of the DC Comics universe), two versions of Jericho were presented. Unlike previous comics, Jericho is not mute and is fully capable of talking by using his voice.

The first version appeared as an antagonist in Rob Liefeld's Deathstroke vol. 2. He and his mother were believed to have died when North Koreans attacked their home. Slade Wilson (now calling himself Deathstroke) had made many enemies worldwide and had repeatedly placed his family in the crosshairs. Jericho at some point exposed himself to the Gen-factor, which gave him his powers. Now a man in his early 20s, Jericho has plans to destroy his father's life that he had built for himself with the help of his mother and brother. However, it was eventually revealed that Jericho had taken control of his own mother and brother and forced them to hate Deathstroke. Joseph was apparently killed along with his brother until a later scene of a worker with glowing green eyes hinted at Joseph possessing a man to save himself and escape.

The second version appears in Deathstroke vol. 3, which erases the previous volume from continuity, with Jericho once again being his heroic and peace-loving self. Due to his enormous powers, Jericho was captured by his own grandfather, Charles Wilson. Under the alias of Odysseus, he wanted to siphon Joe's metahuman power to become practically invincible and experimented on Jericho, awakening new psychic powers within him. Jericho was eventually saved by his father and sister Rose, but the ordeal left Jericho with problems controlling his new powers, and sought solitude while trying to run from Odysseus. Sometime later in Gotham, Jericho met with Rose, who tried to find someone to help Jericho learn to control his new powers, but the meeting went astray and Odysseus shows up to reclaim Jericho. Due to the arrival of Deathstroke, Jericho was able to escape his grandfather's clutches and once again seclude himself. Sometime later, it was revealed that Jericho went to Ra's al Ghul to seeks sanctuary, and had gained better control of his psychic powers. He and Ra's al Ghul reappeared before his father and sister again to save them from his father's enemies, who are also part of the Nova Council, an anti-metahuman organization that targets criminals and those who uses their powers for money. Weeks later, Jericho and his family made a preemptive strike against his father's enemies in which Rose fell under the mental control of Lawman and Jericho had to unleash a strong mental blast to sever the link, but injured Rose's mind in the process. When Ra's al Ghul offered to heal Rose with a special "elixir" in return for Deathstroke's fealty to the League of Assassins, Deathstroke accepted and Ra's al Ghul instructed Jericho to dive into his sister's subconsciousness to bring out of her comatose state. After they retreated, Jericho and Rose also revealed, much to their father's dislike, that they joined the League out of debt for Ra's al Ghul's assistance and to make sure Rose would have access to the "elixir", which Ra's al Ghul stated she would need to take daily if she wanted to live. In their next attack on Danger Island, Jericho used his powers to fight (non-violently) with his family, protecting with his family an energy shield and using his telepathy to halt the enemies' movements. When Deathstroke disobeyed Ra's al Ghul, who was attempting to get the Nova Council into the League by sparing their lives, al Ghul killed Deathstroke's ex-ally Victor Ruiz, causing the two men to begin fighting one another. Jericho intervenes and threatens Ra's al Ghul to stop or he'll kill everyone with a psychic blast. Having read Ra's al Ghul's mind, Jericho also reveals the "elixir" Rose took was just a stimulant, therefore Ra's al Ghul never saved Rose's life. They rescind their oath to the League of Assassins. Once Ra's al Ghul releases them and left, Jericho and Rose tenderly said goodbye to their father, who decided they should distance themselves from him for their safety, and departed from the island.

DC Rebirth

Jericho later reappears after the DC Rebirth relaunch, once again mute and with his origin restored, though slightly modernized. This version of Jericho is also bisexual.

Unlike his blissful childhood in the original comics, Jericho's family life was strained by the time he was a young teenager, as his father and mother were constantly fighting over his father's long absences due to his supposed government missions. After Jericho was kidnapped by Jackal and his throat was slit, an outraged Adeline shot Deathstroke (blinding him in one eye) for his lies, his infidelity that resulted in his illegitimate daughter, Rose, and for Jericho's fate.

As a young adult, Jericho is working as an executive vice-president for a tech firm that his mother owns in Los Angeles, and is engaged to his interpreter, Etienne. Although mute and still using ASL, Jericho uses a special technology called a "subvocal mic", which lets a person's phone Bluetooth sync with the mic so he can vocalize his thoughts through the phone in a computerized voice. After Rose came to visit him, Jericho secretly met up with Dr. David Isherwood, his father's ex-tech, a superhero, and Jericho's former lover. Jericho tells Isherwood of his marriage, and he disapproves of Jericho's choice because of his sexuality. He does not believe his love for Etienne is genuine, and tells Jericho that he will prevent the marriage. Angered by Isherwood's interference, Jericho uses his powers to possess his body, turning off his super "Ikon suit" that allows him to fly, making them fall off a building. Following Dr. Isherwood's seeming demise, Jericho takes over his duties as a superhero and uses the Ikon suit to aid him in his deeds. While out on a mission to help Superman apprehend his father during a government mission, Rose finds out that Etienne is secretly a member of H.I.V.E., though it is unknown if she plans to inform Jericho of Etienne's deception.

While continuing his new superhero duties (which Etienne knows about), Jericho starts taking pills due to experiencing migraines because of his guilt over Isherwood's fall. Later, Jericho meets his father's personal physician, Arthur Villain, who is looking for him, but Jericho explains that his father is "tied up" right now. Wanting to know why he's having migraines, Jericho has Dr. Villain examine him, who also explains the finer details of how his powers work and those of his family members. Dr. Villain states Jericho is perfectly healthy and his problem is an emotional issue, but Jericho denies that something traumatic happened and leaves. That morning, Jericho hallucinates about Isherwood, showing that his migraines have become worse over time, causing him to crash through the shower's glass door. While he hides the reason for his migraines from Etienne, he hastily sets an early wedding date, which she agrees to.

Sometime later, Jericho gets a call from Deathstroke, who is in the middle of a fight with Raptor and Red Lion, to get in contact with Isherwood (who invented the Ikon suits) for his help in deactivating Raptor's Ikon suit. However, Jericho lies about knowing Isherwood's whereabouts, but Deathstroke orders his son to find Isherwood and to call Adeline, which he does. Still wrestling with his guilt, Jericho goes to a hospital to visit Isherwood, revealed to be alive after Jericho made them fall off the building; he is greatly injured and seems to be in a comatose state. Jericho apologizes to Isherwood for his current condition and tells him that he still cares about him. In a flashback to six years ago, it is shown that Isherwood was the one who designed Jericho's bulletproof costume when he was starting out as a young hero and the one who gave him the code name "Jericho". While Jericho's guilt starts causing him to self-harm, he remains oblivious that Etienne is sleeping with his father, who figures out that her mission is to spy on him through his son. He tells Etienne to break up with Jericho. Despite her proclamation of love for his son and their clandestine affair, Deathstroke warns Etienne that he will kill her if she betrays Jericho. After Rose has a bloody vision of Jericho, Rose calls her brother to check on him and learns of his early wedding date with Etienne, much to her disapproval. Rose shares her theory about Etienne working for Adeline to get to Slade, but Jericho states that whatever his parents are up to is between them. While visiting Isherwood, Jericho sees Isherwood's life monitor acting up and orders the nurse to get ready to transport Isherwood to New Jersey. Jericho takes Isherwood to Dr. Villain, who states that Isherwood is dead, but assures a devastated Jericho that are other "possibilities" to help him. While Dr. Villain tries to bring Isherwood back to life, Jericho sits in the waiting room and is told by Dr. Villain that he should see a therapist or someone he trusts to talk to. Meanwhile, Etienne get a lecture from her employer about how she compromised her mission by getting so close to Jericho and then gets a call from Rose, who is traveling to see her brother to prevent the vision she saw. While Jericho returns home, Isherwood comes back to life (using a synthesized virus made from Jericho and Deathstroke's DNA) and calls Jericho on his phone. However, Jericho left his phone in his office and Etienne picks it up, where she finds out about Jericho's past relationship with Isherwood. After Jericho sees his apartment in shambles and Etienne crying, Jericho tries to explain that he was with Isherwood for a few months. Etienne cuts him off and spitefully tells him that she has been seeing Deathstroke behind his back.

It is shown that Etienne works for Amanda Waller and the national government, though she refuses to leave Jericho as she still plans to marry him. During another phone call, Deathstroke confronts Amanda and threatens to kill Etienne if Amanda doesn't stop using his son. She retaliates by threatening to send in her Suicide Squad. On the morning of the wedding, Jericho finds Etienne dead in their apartment and believes his father killed her. Enraged, Jericho goes to the church in his Ikon suit and tries to kill Deathstroke, shocking his family. Despite his father defending his innocence and explaining that Etienne was a spy, Jericho figures out that all of Etienne's activities were because the government wanted to keep an eye on Deathstroke. Although getting brutally beaten, Deathstroke refuses to fight back against his son, who only stops once he hurts Rose in the midst of his rage. Following these events, Jericho is undergoing rehabilitation to deal with his trauma. Later, Jericho is released from rehab and is visited by Wally West, who just had some of his stored super-speed stolen by Deathstroke (wanting to turn back time to revive his son Grant) and Wally asks Jericho to tell him about his father in order to stop him. Jericho agrees, telling him about his difficult childhood, and dons his Ikon suit to help stop Deathstroke. They plan to meet both the Teen Titans and Titans teams at Hatton Corners, the place where Grant died. Before setting out, Jericho takes the time to tell Wally that he doesn't blame the Titans for Grant's death, knowing it's not their fault, and how he struggles every day not to become like his father. After Jericho introduces himself to the Titans, letting them know Deathstroke is his father, he and the two teams work together to open a time vortex to chase his father. Once they stop Deathstroke's super-speed temporarily, Jericho pleads with his father to stop disrupting the time continuum. This was ignored as Deathstroke enters the Speed Force again. Using Omen's and Raven's powers in conjunction with his own, they let most of the team enter Wally's mind so that they can bring him out of the Speed Force once he stops Deathstroke. Wally brought Deathstroke out, Jericho then listens to his father proclaim that he's done being an assassin after his experience in the Speed Force.

Afterward, Jericho returns home and goes to a support group to deal with his pill addiction and the mistakes he made. After the meeting, Deathstroke comes to pick up Jericho and hop on a plane, telling him he has changed after failing to change the past. When Isherwood calls Deathstroke he speaks to Jericho, he tells Jericho he isn't mad at him, hearing his words during his coma, and gives his condolences over Etienne's death. Later, Jericho is taken to a base alongside Rose, his mother, Wintergreen, and Tanya Spears. As the person in charge of the government "Project Defiance", Adeline initially wanted Jericho to lead her new task force, but Deathstroke talks his way into leading the team and handling the recruitment, including getting Kid Flash to join. Meanwhile, Jericho investigates who killed Etienne and confides in Rose that the only reason he agreed to join the team is to learn the truth of Etienne's death and to keep an eye on his father. Later, Jericho and the Defiance team go on their first mission. During another mission to rescue hostages from a dictator in Chetland, Jericho and the team are forced to fight Doctor Light's Radiant Men drones without aid from Deathstroke, who is separated from them to have a private talk with Doctor Light. Despite having a hard time, Jericho takes charge of the team and directs them to successfully fight off the drones, but Deathstroke remotely turns off Jericho's subvocal transmitter and the team's comm channel to make their "training" harder. The Defiance team almost got overwhelmed, but a resurrected Terra arrives to help and save the hostages as Deathstroke regroups with them and orders everyone to head home. Later, Jericho speaks to his mother about his frustrations towards her—how bitter she is because of her grudge against Deathstroke and her unjust hatred towards Rose—and questions her about Etienne's death. Although Adeline states she had no hand in Etienne's death, she brushes off Jericho's other statements, causing Jericho to plead with her to not let Deathstroke corrupt her anymore and become the mother he used to know. During a group session with the team, Kid Flash's recorder reveals that Jericho is beginning to move on from Etienne and met a deaf man named Terrence.

After Deathstroke is abducted by the Secret Society of Super Villains, Jericho finds a note left by The Riddler and shows it to the team. After four days, Jericho and Rose try to rally the team to find him, but Adeline tells them that they have a new mission leading them to the place the Society took their father. After finding the damaged warehouse and hearing some of Terra's investigation, Jericho figures out that a now monstrous-looking Isherwood kidnapped Deathstroke and heads off to find them, against his mother's orders. Upon arriving at the church in Canada, Jericho finds his father alone. Deathstroke lets Jericho know that he knows about his former relationship with Isherwood. While discussing whether Jericho believes Deathstroke is capable of changing, Jericho helps deactivate the neural transmitter in his father's spine, but the transmitter device was a dud and destroys Jericho's Ikon suit instead. Having broken his ribs after falling down on the church's wooden benches, Jericho and Deathstroke return to the Defiance base to recuperate. However, the group begins to fall apart due to the other members learning more of Deathstroke's lies. After getting into a fight with Tanya, Jericho wants to leave the team as he wasn't making any progress with Etienne's death. Later, Jericho comes to back up Deathstroke and Terra on a mission, but the team fractures even more when Kid Flash blames Deathstroke for causing Tanya to seemingly commit suicide. Unknown to the grieving team,  Tanya's incorporeal state is actually traveling through inter-dimensions to save Power Girl. Jericho then returns to his normal life and continues his relationship with Terrence as he reflects over his recent tragedies.

One night, Rose visits Jericho and confesses that she killed Etienne while being possessed by an entity called "Willow", much to his confusion. Their conversation is interrupted when they hear an explosion near Chinatown and find Deathstroke battling Isherwood, Kong Kenan, and a furious Terra. When Jericho tries to intervene in the fight, Isherwood takes the opportunity to knock out Deathstroke and send him to Arkham Asylum. Later, Jericho gets wind of Deathstroke's breakout and his mother's machinations to pit Batman against him, and he scolds Adeline for her actions before she shuts him out. Later, he goes to Wayne Mansion to fix Deathstroke's attempt to sabotage Batman's "benefactor" and free Wintergreen from FBI custody. While running tests on his new upgrade on his Ikon suit with Hosun, Jericho and Hosun tries to figure how to deal with Rose's "Willow" problem, which includes Jericho pretending to be Deathstroke in front of Rose (though she does know her brother is in the suit). However, Jericho is ambushed by Two-Face when he and Rose visit Arkham Asylum and he is in a cell after Two-Face takes his suit. However, Jericho manages to escape the asylum and free his father so they can go save Rose, but his father is too focus on going after Hugo Strange and zaps Jericho unconscious, but later learns Rose is fine. One day, Jericho gets a call from Damian Wayne, who is going after his father, and tries to dissuade him to avail. After speaking to Terrence, Jericho decides to check on his father, who is escaping from his jail cell in Robin's secret prison, to make sure he doesn't hurt the young Titans. After Emiko Queen apparently killed Deathstroke, an angry, grieving Jericho attempts to round up all the villains that attended his father's funeral. In his grief, Jericho confronts the Teen Titans over what they done and uses Kid Flash's body to go the funeral. Due to his strong emotions, Sinestro's ring reacts to Jericho and unleashes a strong energy that knocks out most of the attendees, except for the Legion of Doom members. Intrigued by Jericho's potential, the Legion of Doom offers Jericho a place with them before teleporting away. One night, Jericho prepares for a date with Terrence, but Wintergreen contacts him to help Rose, who is trying to complete assassination contract Deathstroke left unattended due to his "death". Jericho gets into an argument with Terrence, who chastises him for always getting involved with his family members' drama and shows Jericho that he was planning to propose to him. Stunned, Jericho is reluctant to get engaged again and rushes off after Terrence made it clear he won't keep compromising for Jericho's fixation on his family. Jericho saves his sister, but the two soon got into a fight about the contract and Jericho reveals that Emiko is the one that "killed" their father. While trying to keep Rose from taking revenge on Emiko, Jericho becomes gravely injured and calls his mother for help, a hologram Lex Luthor appears to him and offer to help Jericho if he joins the Legion of Doom.

While Jericho is bewildered by Luthor's presence and initially rejects his offer, Jericho ends up accepting a special piece of nanotech as a "gift", which not only healed his wounds, but amplify his abilities and granting him a new suit. However, Jericho's skin becomes blue due to the effect of the technology being embed into his body, though he is in awe of his new powers. Using his enhanced psionic ability, Jericho uses mind-control placing Emiko in hiding at some unknown location to keep her safe from Rose and then goes after his sister, breaking up her chase with Shado. When Rose refuses to listen to him, Jericho tries to hop into her body, but receives mental feedback that disorienting him, causing him to lose his mental control over Emiko and allowing Rose to evade him. Later, Jericho tries to stops Terrence from leaving him and ends using his telepathic power on him get him to stay. Over the course of the next few days, Jericho begins to stop crime more actively using his new powers, but starts developing a Messiah Complex as a result. While Terrence warns Jericho is getting addicted to the nanotech, Jericho claims he will give it back once he helps Rose. Sometime later, Jericho meets up with Luthor and tries to return the nanotech, but takes it back once he learns a Deathstroke doppelganger is hunting for the nanotech.

While looking for Jericho, the doppelganger attacks Terrence, though Rose manages to save him, but Hosun is killed. When the Deathstroke doppelganger targets Adeline, Jericho saves his mother and tricks the doppelganger into shutting down his armor suit, leaving his father to deal with the counterpart. While flying around, Jericho is confronted by Isherwood, who sacrifices his life to forcefully remove the nanotech out of Jericho. Afterwards, a normal Jericho goes to Rose and comfort each other over their recent tragedies. Later during Christmas Eve, Jericho spends the holiday with his family, though his father ends up sneaking out.

Powers and abilities
Jericho can possess a person after making eye contact with them; his body turns insubstantial and enters the subject. While he is in possession, Jericho has access to all of that host's powers (physical, mental, and magical), and is also able to tap into their memories. Jericho's victim remains conscious and can express themselves vocally, but they are otherwise unable to control their body's actions while they are possessed by Jericho. If the person is unconscious or asleep upon possession, Jericho can use their voice to speak, albeit with their accent or any other speech impairments, and only using the words they know. Jericho sometimes uses the American manual alphabet letter "J" as his sign name in order to signal to his allies that he has taken possession of a person. Once the person's mind regains consciousness, they regain their awareness and ability to speak independently.

This power is most effective on human or meta-human bodies; Jericho has twice possessed Superman, but on the first occasion Superman's body had already been taken over by a human scientist who had switched bodies with the Man of Steel, and in the second case Jericho was simply unable to maintain control of the Kryptonian brain for long (most likely the weaker willpower of the scientist made it easier for Jericho to control his body on that occasion). Jericho's power depends on eye contact with living beings; if he is blinded, or the being he attempts to possess is not a natural creature, his power fails. In this way, he was tricked by his teammate Cyborg during a training exercise, when the latter closed his natural eye and Jericho failed to take possession by attempting to contact his artificial eye. Jericho has since overcome this limitation and was able to control Cyborg through his electronic eye. Jericho has also shown the ability to regrow his gouged-out eyeballs; this feat apparently came with the price of still-impaired vision but the return of his possession ability in its full capacity.

Despite his pacifistic nature and dislike for physical violence, he is also skilled in hand-to-hand combat and able to hold his own against his father, Deathstroke.

When possessed by the spirits of Azarath, Jericho had a powerful lion soul self and a healing ability.

Powers and abilities in The New 52
In The New 52, Jericho receives an array of psychic abilities aside from his possession powers, such as being able to telepathically control his brother Grant and his mother Adeline.

Despite conflicting continuity between Deathstroke vol. 2 and 3, Jericho still retains his telepathy to read minds and control others. After being experimented upon, Jericho demonstrated even more powerful abilities to rupture other human beings apart with a psychic blast, much to his horror. Although his telepathy can be blocked by others with mental powers, Jericho can read their aura to see if they hold malicious intents and can also project an energy field to defend against attacks.

Powers and abilities in DC Rebirth
In DC Rebirth, Jericho demonstrates the ability to separate his incorporeal, spiritual self from his physical body when he uses his powers to possess other people. Unlike his usual way of possessing others, Jericho describes this ability like a near field communication, being able to possess people within a certain distance from him, and the person he is possessing speaks using his voice, not theirs. In addition, his physical body is dormant and immobile, leaving it vulnerable to attacks if no one is there to protect it.

Other versions

Earth One
In Teen Titans: Earth One, Jericho serves as an antagonist for the Teen Titans, having been manipulated and brainwashed by Dr. Stone of S.T.A.R. Labs into spying and fighting against his fellow "Project Titans" members.

Tiny Titans
In the children's series Tiny Titans, Jericho is one of the younger toddlers and part of the "Little Tiny Titans" with Wildebeest, Kid Devil and Miss Martian. As a running gag, Jericho often uses his powers to possesses others for his and his friends' benefit and amusement, including his older sister Rose and father Deathstroke.

In other media

Television

 Jericho appears in the Teen Titans animated series. Like his early comic persona, this version can possess any being he can make eye contact with and is mute. He is never personally seen talking, seemingly unable to, however, only talks through those he possesses, including individuals who ironically do not seem able to speak. His relation to Deathstroke (known simply as Slade) is never mentioned. In "Calling All Titans", he meets Beast Boy and is an honorary Teen Titan and has to fight off both Fang and Private H.I.V.E. In "Titans Together", Jericho is one of four heroes who endured an attack from the Brotherhood of Evil and rallied under Beast Boy to launch a final assault against the Brotherhood. He is able to speak while in the body of Cinderblock (voiced by Dee Bradley Baker) due to the fact that Cinderblock has functional vocal cords. However, his power was useless when Gizmo put a bag over his head, unable to make eye contact with anyone. He was saved when reinforcements arrive with Cyborg, Starfire, and Raven. 
 Joe Wilson appears in Arrow, primarily portrayed by Liam Hall, with William Franklyn-Miller portraying the character as a child. This adaptation's violent personality and villainous role is more akin to his brother Grant Wilson, and is not mute like his comic book version. He is mentioned sporadically by his father Slade Wilson during the first two seasons with season six going into further detail, including placing ex-partner Wintergreen as his godfather. Flashbacks show that Joe followed in his father's footsteps and joined the Australian Secret Intelligence Service (ASIS). After his father returned from Lian Yu, Joe and Slade work alongside each other for some time, but their relationship ends abruptly when Slade massacres their comrades in a Mirakuru-induced frenzy and then leaves to exact vengeance on Oliver Queen. Joe becomes a criminal and travels to Kasnia, rejecting his birth name and taking on the alias "Kane Wolfman" (a nod to his mother's maiden name and co-creator Marv Wolfman). After being captured, Joe is freed by the Jackals and feeling abandoned by ASIS, decides to join the criminal organization, eventually becoming their leader. In the present, the now Mirakuru-free Slade and Oliver travel to Kasnia in search of Joe, initially believing him to be a prisoner, but eventually finding out the truth. Slade joins his son's organization, but when Joe tries to get him to kill Oliver, Slade reveals he is a changed man and fights the Jackals alongside his one-time rival. Although Slade and Oliver defeat the Jackals, Joe is able to escape but not before revealing that he has a brother named Grant, whose existence their mother kept from Slade. Blaming himself for what Joe has become, Slade vows to find both of his sons. In season seven, Joe, still going by Kane Wolfman, returns to Star City in Deathstroke's armor, fighting A.R.G.U.S. agents before being apprehended by the Flash, Green Arrow and Supergirl. Taken into A.R.G.U.S. custody, he is recruited as part of the "Ghost Initiative", a new version of the Suicide Squad, taking part in the operation to locate Dante.
 In the "Elseworlds" crossover, when John Deegan changes reality with the Book of Destiny, Wilson becomes a Central City Police Department police officer, trying to unsuccessfully apprehend suspected bank robbers Oliver Queen and Barry Allen alongside fellow officers Malcolm Merlyn and Ricardo Diaz.
 In the non-canon tie-in novel Arrow: Vengeance, Slade returned to Australia, moving back in with his ex-wife Addie and his son Joe. When Slade's ASIS boss Wade DeFarge learned Slade had killed Wintergreen and has been using ASIS resources to track Oliver Queen, Wade attempted to apprehend Slade using ASIS forces. Addie was killed in the firefight that developed. Slade shot DeFarge four times, but the bullets passed through his chest and killed Joe standing over his mother's body.
 Jericho appears in Titans, portrayed by Chella Man. Five years ago, Jericho Wilson lived with his overprotective mother Adeline in San Francisco out of sight of his father. He was Deathstroke's oldest child and, according to his sister Rose, he was killed by his own father about four years ago. Jericho loved and admired his father, even though he was far from home to do his job as a rent killer, an activity he did not know about. Knowing that Deathstroke's fatherly love for his son Jericho would be his weakness, Robin (Dick Grayson) approached the boy and befriended him, and then he discovered Jericho's psychic powers. Dick took him later to the Titans Tower and invited him to join the Titans, while revealing to him the truth about his father. In the episode "Jericho", he is lured to a church to hear the truth from his own father's mouth, Jericho got in the middle of the fight between Deathstroke and Robin. At first he was unsure which side to choose, but he used his own body as a shield to protect Robin and was impaled by his father's sword. Although Dick assumes that Jericho died from his injuries, he later realizes that Jericho survived by using his powers to jump into Deathstroke's body, effectively trapping him inside for the next four years. Jericho is eventually able to escape from his father by jumping to Rose's body after Rose fatally injures Deathstroke.

Film
 Jericho has a non-voiced appearance in the direct-to-video animated superhero film Teen Titans: The Judas Contract. In the film, he's used as a test subject by Brother Blood for a machine that grants the user the superhuman abilities of the metahumans trapped within. After he's finished, Mother Mayhem shoots him in the head and seemingly kills him. In the post-credits scene, Jericho heals from his wound and is shown to possess his iconic glowing green eyes.
 Jericho appears in Deathstroke: Knights & Dragons: The Movie/Deathstroke: Knights & Dragons, voiced by Griffin Puatu while his younger self was voiced by Asher Bishop. In this depiction, Joseph is the only son of Slade and Adeline, sharing a close relationship with father, who dotes on him and often read his favorite book "Knights and Dragons" to him at night. In order to coerce Deathstroke into working for H.I.V.E., Jackal, Bronze Tiger, and other H.I.V.E. agents kidnapped Joseph and the incident ended with Joseph's throat slit and left mute. With his father leaving him soon after and his mother sending him into a private boarding school in Switzerland, the isolation and traumatic events of his kidnapping left a teenage Joseph full of anger and resentment, and he is forced to deal with his awakening powers alone. Jericho eventually team up with his older half-sister, Rose (who was the new leader of an independent H.I.V.E. cell) to take over the world and is christened with the name "Jericho", betraying his father in the process. However, the conflicted Jericho reconciles with his father and mother when they came to save him after he and Rose attempt to take revenge on Jackal. In this iteration, Jericho displays many psionic powers, such as telepathy and pyrokinesis, though his powers are unstable and he is unable to control it, causing him to enter a trance-like state and becoming more violent.

Video games
 Jericho appears in DC Universe Online in a DLC Teen Titan episode scenario based on the "Judas Contract" storyline. In this continuity, Jericho and his mother Adeline Kane aid the Teen Titans to stop Deathstroke for getting revenge on them after Ravager dies just like in the comics.
Jericho is available as a playable character in DC Legends.

Miscellaneous
 Jericho appears in the Teen Titans Go! comic book series. In issue #42, Jericho play a significant role in helping Raven by using his powers to put Raven's scattered "Emoticlones" back together.

Sexuality
When Marv Wolfman and George Pérez were creating the character, they toyed around with the idea of making Joseph gay. Pérez had this to say: "While Marv and I did discuss the possibility of Joseph Wilson being gay, Marv decided that it was too much of a stereotype to have the sensitive, artistic, and wide-eyed character with arguably effeminate features be also homosexual". The DC Rebirth version of Joseph is canonically confirmed to be bisexual.

References

External links
 Titans Tower: Jericho

Characters created by George Pérez
Characters created by Marv Wolfman
Comics characters introduced in 1984
DC Comics characters who have mental powers
DC Comics characters with accelerated healing
DC Comics LGBT superheroes
DC Comics LGBT supervillains
DC Comics male superheroes
DC Comics male supervillains
DC Comics metahumans
DC Comics telepaths
DC Comics titles
Fictional bisexual males
Fictional characters with energy-manipulation abilities
Fictional characters with spirit possession or body swapping abilities
Fictional murderers
Fictional mute characters
Suicide Squad members